Ascent To Anekthor is a 1984 fantasy role-playing game adventure, written by J. Andrew Keith, and  published by Gamelords for Traveller.

Plot summary
Ascent To Anekthor is an adventure in which the player characters join the mountaineering expedition of a daredevil noblewoman. It utilized the rules from The Mountain Environment by the same author.

Publication history
Ascent To Anekthor was written by J. Andrew Keith, with art by William H. Keith Jr., and was published in 1984 by Gamelords as a digest-sized 56-page book.

Reception
Stephen Nutt reviewed Ascent to Anekthor for Imagine magazine, and stated that "Ascent is the one occasion that the players climb a mountain for fun."

Tony Watson reviewed Ascent To Anekthor in Space Gamer No. 72. Watson commented that "Ascent to Anekthor is certainly not the most inspired of adventures, but the climb, if handled correctly, can be a tense and diverting venture for the players."

Reviews
 Different Worlds #40 (July/Aug., 1985)

References

Role-playing game supplements introduced in 1984
Traveller (role-playing game) adventures